Bethlehem University is a Catholic university in the city of Bethlehem in the West Bank, Palestine. It is the first university founded in the Occupied Palestinian Territories.

History 
Established under Israeli Occupation in 1973, the university traces its roots to 1893 when the De La Salle Christian Brothers opened schools in Bethlehem, Jerusalem, Jaffa, Nazareth, Turkey, Lebanon, Jordan, and Egypt and to 1964's Pope Paul VI's visit to the Holy Land in which he promised the Palestinian people a university, a centre for Ecumenical Studies (Tantur Ecumenical Institute) and a school for children with special educational needs (Effetá Paul VI School).

Demographics 
University students are predominantly Muslim, but the proportion of Christian students is far greater than the average Christian presence in Palestinian society.

Academics
Executive Vice-president
Fr. Iyad Twal, Vice-president
Vice-president for Academic Affairs
Dr. Irene Hazou, Vice-president
Faculty of Arts
Ms. Hanadi I. Soudah-Younan, Dean
Shucri Ibrahim Dabdoub, Faculty of Business Administration
Dr. Fadi Kattan, Dean
Faculty of Education
Br. Alejandro González Cerna FSC, Dean
Faculty of Nursing and Health Sciences
Ms. Mariam Samara Awad, Dean
Faculty of Science
Dr. Michel Hanania, Dean
Institute of Hotel Management and Tourism
Mr. Nabil Mufdi, Director
Dean of Research Office
Dr. Jamil Khader, Dean
Dean of Students Office
Mr. Adnan Ramadan, Dean

Graduate programs
Masters in International Cooperation and Development (MICAD)
Masters of Biotechnology
Masters in Tourism Studies
Master in Community Social Work 
Masters in Oncology and Paliative Care Nursing
Higher Diploma in Neonatal Nursing
Higher Diploma in Emergency Nursing
Higher Diploma in Education. Teaching Christian Religion
Higher Diploma in Education. Upper Basic Level - Teaching Science
Higher Diploma in Education. Upper Basic Level - Teaching Mathematics
Higher Diploma in Education. Upper Basic Level - Teaching Social Studies
Higher Diploma in Education. Upper Basic Level - Teaching English Language
Higher Diploma in Education. Upper Basic Level - Teaching Arabic Language

Institutes and centers
Brother Vincent Malham Center of Arabic Language for Foreigners
Palestinian Traditional Music Archive
The Arabic School for Overseas Students & Diplomats
Cardinal Martini Leadership Institute
Center for Excellence in Teaching and Learning
Hereditary Research Laboratory
Institute for Community Partnership (ICP)
Zbierski Library
UNESCO Biotechnology, Educational and Training Center
Water And Soil Environmental Research Unit
Palestinian Museum of Natural History
Palestinian Institute for Biodiversity and Sustainability
Zoroub Teaching Resource Center

See also
Education in the Palestinian territories
List of Palestinian universities

References

External links 
Directory of Faculty and Staff 
 

 
Buildings and structures in Bethlehem
Lasallian colleges and universities
Association of Catholic Colleges and Universities
Educational institutions established in 1973
1973 establishments in the Israeli Military Governorate
Catholic universities and colleges
Nursing schools in the State of Palestine